Seyed Mohammad Reza Saeidi Madani (born 19 June 1987 in Tehran) is an Iranian Judo, Sambo and jiujitsu athlete. He is captain of the Iran Judo national team. He won the bronze medal at the 2017 Asian Indoor and Martial Arts Games in Ashgabat. He won first medal in the history of Iranian Sambo at the 2021 Sambo World Championships in Tashkent, Uzbekistan and the 2nd place at the 2021 Sambo Asian Championships in Uzbekistan and the 3rd place at the 2022 Sambo Asian Championships in Lebanon.He won the Gold Medal at the 2019 Csit World Sport Games in Spain. He is a Member of the Iranian Jiujitsu National Team during the 2018 Jiujitsu World Championship in the United Arab Emirates.he won the bronze medal at the 2021 Islamic Solidarity Games in Konya, Turkey.

References

External links 
 Seyed Mohammadreza Saeedi Madani on Instagram

Living people
1987 births
Iranian jujutsuka
Sportspeople from Tehran